Robert Stewart Menzies (1856 – 25 January 1889)  was a Scottish Liberal Party politician who sat in the House of Commons from 1885 to 1889.

Menzies was the son of Graham Menzies (died 1880), an Edinburgh distiller of Hallyburton, Cupar Angus, and his wife Beatrice (d.1899), daughter of William Dudgeon, merchant of Leith, Edinburgh. He was educated at Harrow School, and at Christ Church, Oxford and was called to the bar at  Lincoln's Inn in 1882. He was a J.P.  for Perthshire and Forfar.

In 1885, Menzies was elected Member of Parliament for East Perthshire.  He held the seat until his death at the age of 33 in 1889. He was the uncle of Major-General Sir Stewart Menzies.

References

External links 
 

1856 births
1889 deaths
People educated at Harrow School
Alumni of Christ Church, Oxford
Scottish Liberal Party MPs
Members of the Parliament of the United Kingdom for Scottish constituencies
UK MPs 1885–1886
UK MPs 1886–1892